was a Japanese politician who was a member of the House of Councillors from 1977 to 1986, and of the House of Representatives from 1990 to 2012. He served two terms as Minister of Finance, and as Secretary General of the Liberal Party and the Democratic Party of Japan.

Biography
A native of Tokyo, Fujii was born on 24 June 1932. He graduated from the University of Tokyo in 1955 with a law degree. He began his career as a bureaucrat in the Ministry of Finance, which gave him authority on finance and tax system issues later in his legislative career. Toward the end of his time at the ministry, he served as an assistant to Chief Cabinet Secretaries Susumu Nikaido and Noboru Takeshita.

He was elected to the House of Councilors for the first time in the 1977 election as a member of the Liberal Democratic Party. After serving two terms, he declined to run in 1986 in order to plan a run for the House of Representatives, and won a seat representing Kanagawa Prefecture in the 1990 general election.

In 1993 he left the LDP and joined the formation of the Japan Renewal Party, which later became part of the DPJ. He served as Minister of Finance in the cabinets of Morihiro Hosokawa and Tsutomu Hata, and did not substantially change the previous LDP government's financial policy objectives.

Fujii was a member of Ichiro Ozawa's Liberal Party during the late 1990s, and served as its secretary-general and headed its financial committee while it was in a coalition government with the LDP. Fujii historically supported Ozawa in opposing any increase in the consumption tax.

Fujii lost his seat in the 2005 general election and planned to retire from politics. However, he returned to the Diet in 2007 with retroactive effect after two incumbent representatives resigned. In the run-up to the 2009 general election, he led a campaign to stop Ozawa from becoming the president and prime ministerial candidate of the DPJ. He initially intended to retire from the Diet following the election, and allowed another DPJ candidate to run for his district, but withdrew his resignation at the request of Yukio Hatoyama shortly before candidate lists were finalized. The DPJ won the election in a landslide, and Fujii maintained a seat in the House despite being ranked only 35th on the party's candidate list.

DPJ government (2009–2012) 
Fujii was named minister of finance after the election of Hatoyama as Prime Minister in September 2009. Shortly following his appointment, Fujii publicly opposed intervention to weaken the Japanese yen for the benefit of Japanese exporters, saying that other countries would be inclined to do the same thing. He later clarified that he did not favor a strong yen and was not pleased with its recent appreciation in value. Fujii also reversed his historical position on the consumption tax, and demanded the appointment of two vice ministers, Yoshihiko Noda and Naoki Minezaki, who were in favor of raising it. Ozawa told Fujii in December 2009 that he failed to demonstrate political leadership, and persuaded Hatoyama to change the party's campaign promise on gasoline taxes over Fujii's objections.

Fujii abruptly announced his resignation as finance minister on 5 January 2010, and it was reluctantly accepted by Prime Minister Hatoyama a day later. Fujii had been suffering from high blood pressure and exhaustion, so he claimed that his deteriorating health forced him to resign from the high-stress position of finance minister. However, some political analysts believed that Fujii resigned due to his power struggle with Ozawa.

On 7 January 2010, Naoto Kan replaced Fujii as finance minister. Fujii served in the Kan cabinet as Deputy Chief Cabinet Secretary. Noda took over the finance portfolio under the Kan government, and succeeded Kan as prime minister in 2011. Fujii remained in regular contact with Noda throughout this time, but was careful to keep a low profile in doing so. He publicly maintained his position on yen intervention, stating in 2011 that it was more important for Japan to open its markets.

He announced his retirement from politics at the age of 80, shortly prior to the 2012 general election.

Death 
Fujii died on 10 July 2022 at his home in Tokyo, aged 90.

References

External links 
  in Japanese.

|-

1932 births
2022 deaths
People from Tokyo
University of Tokyo alumni
Ministers of Finance of Japan
Members of the House of Representatives (Japan)
Members of the House of Councillors (Japan)
Democratic Party of Japan politicians
Liberal Democratic Party (Japan) politicians
Japan Renewal Party politicians
Liberal Party (Japan, 1998) politicians
21st-century Japanese politicians
Politicians from Tokyo